Michelle Good is a Cree writer, poet, and lawyer from Canada, most noted for her debut novel Five Little Indians. She is a member of the Red Pheasant Cree Nation in Saskatchewan. Good has an MFA and a law degree from the University of British Columbia and, as a lawyer, advocated for residential-school survivors.

Early life and education
Good is a member of the Red Pheasant Cree Nation. She was impacted by the 60s scoop and spent time in the foster care system. Her great-grandmother participated in the 1885 uprising at Frog Lake and her uncle was Big Bear. Good graduated from the University of British Columbia with a Masters of Fine Arts in Creative writing in 2014. The first draft of her debut novel, Five Little Indians, was her graduate thesis project. She began to practice law in her 40's, sharing the histories of residential schools in courtrooms.

Works

Five Little Indians 

Five Little Indians is a story about five British Columbia residential-school survivors. Although the novel itself is fiction, some of the episodes were based on real experiences of her mother and grandmother, who were both survivors of Canada's residential school system. Published in 2020, the novel was longlisted for the Giller Prize and shortlisted for the Rogers Writers' Trust Fiction Prize. Now listed it as one of the top 10 novels of 2020.

In 2021 the book won the Governor General's Award for English-language fiction at the 2020 Governor General's Awards, the Amazon.ca First Novel Award, and the Kobo Emerging Writer Prize. In 2021, the book was optioned to be adapted as a limited television series.

Poetry 

 Defying Gravity published in Best Canadian Poetry 2016 and Best of the Best Canadian Poetry, A Tenth Anniversary Edition

Essays 

 A Tradition Of Violence published in Keetsahnak, Our Sisters: Walking with Murdered Indigenous Women, Girls and Two-Spirit Peoples

References 

21st-century Canadian novelists
21st-century Canadian women writers
21st-century First Nations writers
Canadian women novelists
First Nations novelists
First Nations women writers
Writers from Saskatchewan
Cree people
Living people
Year of birth missing (living people)
Canadian women poets
First Nations poets
Governor General's Award-winning fiction writers
Amazon.ca First Novel Award winners
Red Pheasant Cree Nation